The Haunold is a mountain in the Dolomites in South Tyrol, Italy.

References 

 Richard Goedeke: Sextener Dolomiten. (Alpine Club Guide) Bergverlag Rother, 2003. 

Mountains of the Alps
Mountains of South Tyrol
Dolomites